Amrutha Ghalige is a 1984 Indian Kannada-language romantic drama film directed by Puttanna Kanagal, based on the  novel Avadhana, by Dodderi Venkatagiri Rao. The film stars Ramakrishna, Padma Vasanthi and Sridhar.

Plot 
This movie deals with the cause and consequences of teenage pregnancy. The heroine (Padmavasanthi), hailing from a poor background, falls in love with an affluent young man (Ramakrishna). The young man impregnates her and leaves her in the lurch. The heroine's classmate (Sridhar) comes forward to marry her and give an identity to the child. Unfortunately, the classmate dies due to illness soon after. The young man comes back and unexpectedly meets his son. The classmate writes a letter that he had considered the heroine as his sister, and she was as pure as river Ganges. Finally the young man accepts the heroine. This movie  has very good songs and great lyrics.

Cast 
 Ramakrishna as Manohar [Manu]
 Padma Vasanthi as Renuka (Renu)
 Sridhar as Madhu
 Jyoti as Manu's Sister
 Kalpanarani as Savitri (Madhu's Sister)
 Umashree 
 B. K. Shankar as Halappa (shopkeeper)

Soundtrack 
All songs are composed by Vijaya Bhaskar, with lyrics written by Vijaya Narasimha.

Awards 
 Karnataka State Film Awards 1983–84
 Best Screenplay – Puttanna Kanagal
 Best Cinematographer – B. S. Basavaraj
 Best Editor – V. P. Krishna

References

External links 
 

1984 films
1980s Kannada-language films
Films directed by Puttanna Kanagal
Films based on Indian novels
Films scored by Vijaya Bhaskar